"Gangstertown (Past-Present-Future)" is a song by Dutch pop group Ch!pz. It is the first single for Part 1 EP released in 2006. The single reached the Top 5 of the Dutch Top 40 and No. 2 at Single Top 100.

Charts

Weekly charts

Year-end charts

References

2006 singles
Ch!pz songs
2006 songs